Systoloneura randiae is a moth of the family Gracillariidae. It is known from South Africa.

The larvae feed on Coddia rudis. They probably mine the leaves of their host plant.

References

Endemic moths of South Africa
Gracillariinae
Moths of Africa
Moths described in 1961